Duncan McLaren Martin (May 1854 – October 19, 1934) was an American educator and college football coach. He served as the head football at Hillsdale College in Hillsdale, Michigan in 1896 and again in 1898, compiling a record of 4–4–1. Martin was also a professor of mathematics at Hillsdale for 11 years before leaving the school in 1903 to manage an irrigation project on the Colorado River in Arizona and California. Before coming to Hillsdale, he was the principal of the public schools in Prescott, Arizona.

References

External links
 

1854 births
1934 deaths
American school principals
Hillsdale Chargers football coaches
Hillsdale College faculty
People from Byron, New York